Oakley is an unincorporated community in Liberty Township, Lucas County, Iowa, United States. Oakley is located along county highways H20 and S23, north-northwest of Chariton.

History
Founded in the 1800s, Oakley's population was 70 in 1902.

References

Unincorporated communities in Lucas County, Iowa
Unincorporated communities in Iowa